Small Kindness is the name of a charity organization founded by Yusuf Islam (formerly known as Cat Stevens). Small Kindness has earned the respect and admiration of local communities in all its major countries of operation. In recognition of this Yusuf Islam was awarded the World Social Award by the World Awards Committee for the important work Small Kindness is doing and in 2004 the charity earned the WANGO Humanitarian Award from the World Association of NGOs.

Program Strategy
To help the most vulnerable victims of war and conflict, such as orphans, widows, and young girls, by providing direct relief and support with minimum administrational costs, by employing and utilizing local staff and infrastructure, being continuously sensitive to the cultural needs of the communities we are serving.

Living Necessities
Direct financial support for the most needy, especially orphans, widows, elderly and refugees.

Education
Courses for female students and specialised training in Information Technology, Management, Foreign languages, Marketing, Finance and Accountancy, leading to professional qualifications meeting European standards; enabling students to gain employment. Also providing University scholarships to assist needy students, particularly young women.

Shelter
Small Kindness assists whenever possible to rebuild the houses of victims that have been destroyed or damaged during times of conflict. In the Balkans, many thousands are still displaced through ethnic-cleansing and need shelter due to the loss of their homes.

Culture & Leisure
Establishment of Recreation Centers where youth can meet and enjoy various activities such as sports and learn to use computer technology through games and motivational software.

Publications
Publishing magazines and tape cassettes in local languages for children and families that promote healthy moral and cultural values through entertaining articles and cartoon comic series.

References

External links
Small Kindness Official Website

Charities based in London